Fatali Khan or Fath Ali Khan of Quba (1736 – March 29, 1789) was a khan of the Quba Khanate (1758–1789) who also managed to dominate the Derbent, Baku, Talysh and Shirvan Khanates, as well as the Salyan Sultanate during much of his reign.

Early years
Fatali was born in 1736 in Quba to Husayn Ali Khan of Quba Khanate and Peri Jahan-Bike, daughter of Ahmad Khan, Utsmi of Kaitags. He was related to other Dagestani rulers, such as Umma Khan V, who was his maternal cousin, Amir Hamza, his cousin and brother-in-law, as well as Utsmi of Kaitags among others. According to the 19th-century Azerbaijani military historian Iskandar by Hajinski (1809-1878), he had no special education and "he spent his youth just as sons of other khans, i.e. in idleness. Once, his father wanted to punish him for his prank, but he hid until his father’s anger faded." He was sent to subjugate Salyan Sultanate in 1755 or 1756 by his father, a mission he accomplished successfully.

His father died in 1758 at the age of 49, leaving the throne to his young son.

Reign 
Just 7 days after his father's death, the brother of Aghasi Khan of Shirvan, Agharazi beg, invaded the Barmak Mahal of Quba and carried off 200 families. In response, Fatali Khan set out to Shirvan and captured about 400 families and settled them onto his possessions, killing Agharazi in a battle near Old Shamakhi.

Fatali, to consolidate his rule in the khanate, introduced several legal reforms. He abolished the system of naibate, who was in charge of taxation of districts of the khanate and could prove powerful in a time of turbulence. Instead, he charged ketkhudas (stewards of villages) with this job, which would be overseen by yasauls, directly answering to khan himself.

Campaign in Derbent, Shaki and Baku
Soon after this victory, Fatali set his eyes on neighboring states and started to expand his influence. According to Abbasgulu Bakikhanov, he besieged Derbent in 1759 when the inhabitants sent him messages inviting him to remove Tahir bey, their ruler. He took territories of Derbent on the right bank of the Samur River – Mushkur, Niyazoba, Shabran, Rustov, Beshbarmag and also villages of Ulus district from Derbent's khan. Same year, he campaigned against Gazikumukh Khanate whose khan Muhammad recently killed Aghakishi beg, Khan of Shaki and defeated him, installing Muhammad Husayn Khan Mushtaq in his place.

Later in 1765, Fatali Khan annexed all of Derbent Khanate to his possessions with the help of Tarki Shamkhalate, Kaitag Utsmiate and Principality of Tabasaran. Subordinating Derbent, Fatali Khan gave a part of revenues of lands in Derbent Khanate to Shamkhal and Utsmi, while the ruler of Tabasaran was given monetary compensation. Derbent's ruler Muhammad Hussein Khan was blinded and sent with his five-year-old son Ali begs to Quba, and then to Baku, where he was kept until he died in 1768. Ali began to live as the hostage of Khan in Baku until 1796.

Soon Fatali Khan married Tuti Bike – his cousin and sister of Kaitag utsmi Amir Hamza III in 1766. But in his turn, he refused to marry his younger half-sister Khadija Bike to him. Instead, he married her to Malik Muhammad Khan – son of Baku’s Khan Mirza Muhammad I. effectively subordinating the Baku Khanate to himself. Control over the ports of Baku, Derbent, and Salyan, as well as their Caspian commerce in salt and crude oil, provided Khan money and reputation. Already disgruntled over marriage refusal, Amir Hamza captured Derbent and held it for 3 days with the excuse of visiting his sister. Fatali Khan later drove Amir Hamza and his Kaitag tax collectors from Derbent and took away the revenues villages which he presented to Amir Hamza. Fatali, then appointed Eldar bek, disgruntled nephew of Muhammad Khan of Gazimukh as a steward of Derbent. These steps further alienated Dagestani lords from Fatali, who started to see him as a regional rival.

Campaign in Shamakhi 
In 1767/8, in alliance with Muhammad Husayn Khan Mushtaq of Sheki he invaded Shamakhi which was ruled by Aghasi Khan and Muhammad Said Khan brothers. Several Dagestani rulers, including Akusha-Dargo Union and Principality of Tabasaran also joined the march. After the short victory on the battlefield, the brothers wanted to negotiate. Muhammad Said khan himself went to Fatali Khan's court while Aghasi headed to Shaki. Aghasi khan was blinded by the khan of Shaki while his brother was imprisoned by Fatali.

Fatali Khan and Muhammad Huseyn Khan divided the lands of Shirvan Khanate between themselves. Kessan and Sadanrud districts were given to Shaki, while Fatali took the lion's share. Fatali Khan ordered to destroy New Shamakhi up to the foundation and to resettle the residents to the older one. In one of the documents of period it was written that: “…Fatali Khan gave New Shamakhi to Huseyn Khan, but took himself the older one”. Beginning from 1768, in official Russian documents and titular appeals, Fatali khan was named “high-degree and highly respected Khan of Derbent, Quba and Shamakhi”.

Soon, sides fell into distrust over the unfair division of lands. Manaf Zarnavai, a naib of the Muhammad Huseyn (and son of former Hajji Mohammad Ali Khan) in New Shamakhi conspired to seize Fatali's lands by force, but Fatali's informants revealed intentions of conspirators and leading him to gather an army of 15,000 and suddenly invading rest of the khanate on 17 August 1768, arresting Manaf himself. The Shaki armies were crushed by the Quba and Gazikumukh alliance on 20 September 1768, Shirvan was fully annexed to the Quba Khanate. The peace agreement was signed in July 1769.

According to Stepan Sharipin and Egor Zamyatin, Russian merchants from Astrakhan, "Huseyn khan wanted to possess all seized lands in Shamakhi and then to be its ruler, but no one can repudiate Fatali khan from it."

Meanwhile, the blinded ex-ruler of Shamakhi - Aghasi Khan escaped to Shaki and urged him to attack Fatali to retake Shirvan. This alliance was joined by Muhammad IV, Nutsal of Avars, who didn’t want to strengthen the Khan of Quba. He sent an armed detachment under his sons Bulach, and Muhammad Mirza.  Sides met at the outskirts of Shamakhi and decided to negotiate first. However, soon a fight broke out and turned into a full-blown battle. Both sons of Avar Khan died during the battle, and the khans of Shaki and Shamakhi escaped the scene.

A few years later, in 1774, Avar nuts, persuaded by Aghasi Khan again marched on Shamakhi and captured the city briefly. But, soon, Fatali Khan set out to Shirvan with the army and detachment led by Malik Mahammad Khan, khan of Baku in alliance with his traditional allies Akusha-Dargo Union and Principality of Tabasaran. Nutsal was defeated near Old Shamakhi. Fatali khan promised him safety and invited him for discussions to himself where Muhammad was murdered by Dargins of Akusha.

Struggle in Dagestan 

The murder of Avar Khan caused alarmed the neighboring rulers in Dagestan. New Avar leader Umma Khan tried to forge an anti-Quba alliance with other Dagestani and Caucasian feudal lords by marrying his sister Bakhtika to Ibrahim Khalil Khan of Karabakh. The Dagestani coalition of rulers included old foe of Fatali Kaitag utsmi Amir Hamza, his son-in-law Muhammad of Gazikumukh, Ali-Sultan - Khan of Mehtuli, Ghāzī Rustam of Tabasaran, Tishsiz Muhammad (Muhammad the Toothless) - head of Kazanishche Kumyks; they were also joined by the Kumyks of Endirey, Kostek and others.

Having gathered a 4,000-strong army, the coalition was led by Amir Hamza who marched into Quba but retreated north where he was ambushed by Fatali's armies. Nevertheless, the coalition defeated Fatali's army of 8,000 in the battle of Gavdushan, near the city of Khudat in July 1774 and forced him to flee to Salyan. Muhammad the Toothless perished during the battle from the Dagestani, while Eldar-beg, Fatali's viceroy in Derbent, and Maysum Shaykh-Ali of Tabasaran were killed from Quba side.

Muhammad of Gazikumukh seized Quba as a result  while Aghasi Khan, using a power vacuum has re-established himself in Shirvan. Amir Hamza attempted to capture Derbent by ruse, which was ruled by his sister Tuti Bike during the absence of her husband. Amir, accompanying body of perished Tishsiz Muhammad, approached the city and informed his sister that Fatali Khan died in a struggle and that he has brought his body. But Tuti, according to a legend defended the city walls and ordered to open fire to his army and then sent a detachment, which forced Amir Hamza to retreat to Mushkur. Soon Amir Hamza gathering an army, raided Baku Khanate and besieged Derbent. Meanwhile, Fatali khan sneaked his way to Derbent secretly and started gathering his adherents.

While in a difficult situation, he sent his envoy Mirza Bey Bayat from Salyan to Petersburg, empress Catherine II, with a letter in which he appealed for help and offering vassalage to Russian Empire in return. Russians in turn sent 2350 soldiers under the command of General Johann von Medem in 1775. Arrival of Russian army alarmed Muhammad of Gazikumukh, who evacuated Quba which was retaken by Fatali. Khan met von Medem near Darvag and led them to Derbent. Amir Hamza, raised the siege of Derbent after 9 months and tried to battle Medem, but was defeated by Russian army in Iran-Kharab. Fatali Khan recaptured Derbent and sent keys to the city to Catherine II and asked to grant him the citizenship of Russia again. 

Soon on 10 May 1775 Fatali Khan marched on Kaitag Utsmiate and Principality of Tabasaran with a Russian detachment led by major Cridner. Amir Hamza attacked them near Bashlykent, “but he was overthrown by an action of the artillery with great losses and took to flight.”  According to Mirza Hasan Alkadari, he also defeated Muhammad of Gazikumukh's armies and took neighboring Kura plain. Fatali Khan then moved to Tabasaran and defeated them near Khalag. However, later on, Crinder and Fatali Khan were surrounded in a narrow ravine and suffering a significant detriment, forced to return to Derbent. 

Participants of the anti-Quba coalition asked for peace and offered hostages but also demanded Fatali to vacate Derbent. But the Russian command didn't accept their conditions. On March 24 and then in April, 1776 sides convened a meeting in Darvag.  A peace consensus was reached in the second meeting, according to which Kaitags and Tabasarans were under obligation to leave Derbent and Quba alone with their possessions and not to interfere in trade between Russia and Quba. Despite hat, Russian envoy in the meeting, major Fromgold reported that “there will never be a desired calmness here. Despite Utsmi [of Kaitags] and Qadi [of Tabasaran] agreed not to harm the [Fatali] Khan, it is a matter of time for them to only turn on him again”.

To further weaken his foes, Fatali Khan drew Shikhmardan Bek – second son of Muhammad of Gazikumukh Khan - to his side, gave him a part of a Kura district up to Kabirek, which earlier belonged to Derbent Khanate, and revenues of Guney district that belonged Quba and from which Kura Khanate would later emerge. He also granted Amir Hamza's nephew Muhammad beg 100 families from Quba and founded the eponymous village of Mamedkala for him.

He also aided Tabasaran princes Muhammad Husayn, Sohrab, Shir Ali and Mustafa, whose ruling cousin Novruz bek was killed by Ali Qoli in 1776, a usurper. Fatali in his turned detained Ali Qoli in Derbent and exiled him to Salyan, and installed Muhammad Husayn beg as new prince. Approval of his protégé in the Southern Tabasaran had a great role in a struggle with rulers of the Southern Dagestan. Kizlyar's Russian commandant to the government that Fatali was more powerful now that he could attack Kaitag Utsmi with help from Tabasaran.

Relations with Russian, Ottoman Empires and Persia
When war between Russia and Ottomans broke out in 1768, the Porte attempted to draw Fatali to their side with no results. A contemporary Russian report said that “Recently, Turks sent some officers to the khan of Quba, who rules Derbent and he will persuade lezgis to arm against Russia in favor of the Porte”. Messengers of Crimea's khan Qırım Giray also came to Fatali khan with a request to come over to Porte's side and oppose Russia, a request he left responseless. Besides that, he refused a request about letting pass to the Ottoman army and advised other rulers not to collaborate with them. 

In 1768, Talysh Khan Gara Khan's lands were invaded by Gilaki Hedayat-Allah Khan. Gara Khan's brother Kalb Ali (or Karbalai) Sultan on the other hand appeal to Fatali Khan for help. Seeing this as an opportunity to extend his influence, khan demanded the release of Gara Khan under the pretext that the Talysh beys recognized him as their overlord and pledged to pay tribute, and therefore Gara Khan should be released and returned to Lankaran. 

In July 1769 Russian consul to Baku informed the authorities that khan refused the request of the Sultan's government to act against Russia and refused to admit gifts delivered to him. In September 1770 one of the diplomatic representatives of Russia wrote that “Fatali Khan didn’t show any inclination to their side; indeed, he doesn’t want to begin anything against Russia, except a continuing benevolence.” 

Despite Fatali's repeated requests for official protection of the Russian government, the latter didn’t want to complicate relations with Persia and Ottoman Empire and to change the order of political forces in the South Caucasus. Count Panin, minister of foreign affairs in his letter informed Fatali khan that the empress “confers him to the goodwill of Russian Empire for his diligence”, but can’t accept him to citizenship, because it can be a breach of agreement among Russia, Iran and the Ottoman Empire. He pointed out that Fatali khan was an Iranian subject. 

In September 1775 Catherine II ordered President of the College of War Grigory Potemkin to give the keys of Derbent back following the Turkish pressure.  Soon the Russian army was withdrawn from Dagestan to Kizlyar. 

Meanwhile Karim khan Zand, the contender for the Iranian throne approached Fatali Khan and asked for his allegiance unsuccessfully.

Campaign of Gilan
In summer of 1781, Agha Mohammad Khan Qajar's army conquered Gilan Khanate and its ruler Hedayat-Allah Khan was forced to escape to Fatali Khan. Fatali Khan sent 9,000 strong army to Gilan in alliance with Tarki Shamkhalate and Kaitag Utsmiate; the general command was carried out by the nazir Mirza bey Bayat. They could oust the forces of Agha Mohammad Khan Qajar and reestablish Hidayat Khan’s reign in Gilan, forcing Qajar to return to Gilan.

Struggle in South Caucasus 

Emboldened by his successes, Fatali desired to extend his influence to the rest of the South Caucasus. He invaded Karabakh Khanate in 1780 by crossing the Kura River, but the Georgian king Erekle II helped Ibrahim Khalil Khan by sending him a detachment under the command of princes George and David. In August of that year, the khan undertook an unsuccessful campaign again, but at the beginning of 1781, he could penetrate deep into Karabakh and drive away some peasants from there. Meanwhile his brother-in-law and vassal Malik Muhammad Khan was captured in Karabakh and was later released. Seeing this as humiliation, Fatali appointed 11 year old Mirza Muhammad Khan II as Baku khan and forced his father to go on pilgrimage in 1781. Thanks to his sister acting as regent for khan, Fatali became true ruler of Baku.

He also released the brother of Aghasi Khan, Muhammad Said and reinstated him in Shirvan Khanate, married his sister Fatima to Muhammad Said's son Muhammad Reza, causing rivalry between the two brothers, thus weakening Shirvan. 

Seeing Heraclius as an obstacle in his campaign for dominion in the Caucasus, he supported prince Alexander – an aspirant to the throne of Kartli-Kakheti – accompanied by prince Alexander Amilakhvari in August 1782. Fatali's harboring of a potential rival to the Georgian throne was one of the factors that forced Heraclius II to seek Russian protection. Fatali gave them up to Russian government only after Treaty of Georgievsk.

He later marched on Karabakh Khanate in 1783 in alliance with Haji Khan, and besieged Ibrahim Khalil Khan in Shusha fortress unsuccessfully. Ibrahim Khalil then armed Muhammad Hasan to depose Haji, who would flee to Aghasi Khan and be returned to Shaki, where he was killed. Deprived of an important ally, Fatali returned to south in spring of 1784 to do the same and attacked Karabakh ally Ardabil Khanate, pushing out Ibrahim Khalil's in-law Nazarali Khan Shahsevan, seizing Ardabil and Meshkin. He then appointed Hasan Khan Shahseven of Javad as a governor to Ardabil, and Khudaverdi bey to Meshkin. Not wanting a new escalation with Qajar Iran, Potemkin demanded that Fatali withdraw his troops. Soon Fatali withdrew to Quba, preparing another campaign in Shirvan.

Soon in 1785, Fatali khan forced Gara Khan of Talysh to be his vassal. He was replaced by Mir Mustafa Khan in 1786, who was in Fatali's custody. Now in charge of entire Caucasian coast of Caspian Sea, Fatali decided to march on Shirvan Khanate. 

Fatali got a chance in 1785 to smooth relations with Karabakh Khanate. Mehrali bey, who was Ibrahim Khalil Khan's brother went to a political asylum after his former patron Karim Khan Zand's death in 1779. However, Mehrali bey was ambushed on his way from Baku to Shirvan by Ahmed Khan, son of Aghasi Khan of Shirvan. Fatali sent his body back to Shusha with all due respect. Now left out of an important ally and afraid, Aghasi Khan submitted to Fatali Khan who detained and have him sent to Quba with his sons. Fatali then moved on to Shaki do defeat Muhammad Hasan Khan. Left alone without any ally, Muhammad Hasan was forced to make peace with marrying to Huri khanum, sister of Fatali Khan and married his own sister Tubu Khanum to Fatali. 

He forged an alliance with Tarki Shamkhalate, marrying his son Ahmad Khan to Kichik Bike, daughter of shamkhal Bammat II in 1787.  Amir Hamza, his old foe also died that year and was succeeded by his brother Ustar Khan, who was more friendly to Fatali.

Meanwhile, Fatali Khan kept ex-Shirvan Aghasi and his sons Ahmad and Muhammad in Qonaqkənd in house arrest. Muhammad Said, afraid of Fatali's possible alliance with Aghasi, fled to Shaki, while is son Muhammad Reza himself came to Fatali. Fatali ordered him to escort his uncle and cousins to prison in Baku while he appointed Muhammad Reza as the new Khan of Shirvan. Fatali also demanded Muhammad Hasan Khan to return Muhammad Said with his two other sons Mahmud and Iskandar, who were sent to Salyan to be imprisoned. Muhammad Hasan's vassal Shabaddin Sultan, Sultan of Arash was tasked with arresting Muhammad Said's other sons Askar and Qasim, and Mustafa. However, brothers were released their supporters along the way near Goychay, who would later flee to Umma Khan.

At the end of 1786, Umma Khan began a punitive campaign against Shamakhi citing the reason that Fath Ali violated the terms of the agreement to pay Umma 5,000 rubles annually. Approaching Shemakha, the highlanders suddenly attacked and captured the city. Shemakha was burned down and the inhabitants were killed. Fatali was besieged in Aghsu for 9 months. He was supported by Agha Muhammad Khan's brother Morteza Qoli with his loyal detachment. However, Fatali was forced to enter into negotiations with Umma Khan, betrothed him his daughter as his future wife, and handed over the revenues of Salyan and 200,000 rubles of indemnity. The marriage on the other hand never took place. Not achieving their target, Sarkar princes left for Akhalkalaki in Ottoman Empire. In 1788, Fatali khan ordered to execute khans of Shamakhi with their sons in Baku and Salyan, and his own son-in-law Mahammad Reza in Quba. 

This execution wave alarmed the Dagestani rulers again. Ali Soltan, Khan of Mehtuli soon marched on Quba in alliance with Muhammad Hasan Khan and Umma Khan in 1788. Allies captured Aghsu and the bulk of the territory. However, later the Mehdi, Shamkhal of Tarki came to Fatali Khan's rescue and forced Umma Khan to retreat to Karabakh, domains of his brother-in-law Ibrahim Khalil Khan. Ali Sultan, then's to a request through Mehdi, was permitted to return to his domains. According to Heraclius II's letter to Grigory Potemkin on 20 January 1788, Umma Khan not having achieved another pan-Dagestani coalition against Fath Ali Khan (they refused to be fight citing religious reasons), only managed to forge an alliance against Georgia. Muhammad Hasan on the other hand was forced to accept vassalage of Quba.

In January 1787 Fatali Khan defeated opposing him Ibrahimkhalil Khan.

End of reign 
In March 1787, an agreement between Fatali Khan signed an agreement with Heraclius II of Kartli-Kakheti, which was of great importance in the establishment of balance in the South Caucasus and strengthening of Russia’s position in the region. By that time, the authority of Cuba's ruler spread up in Derbent, Shirvan khanate and Salyan. Baku, Sheki and Talish khanates were under vassalage of Fatali Khan. According to Isgandar bey Hajinsky, Fatali Khan's choice for this agreement was to secure peace on west and prepare for the conquest of Tabriz Khanate.

During the negotiations, Prince Georgi Tsitsishvili and Gurgen bek Enikolopashvili were Georgian ambassadors to Quba, while Mirza Rahim, Fatali Khan's envoy Haji, was sent to Tiflis. This circumstance made it possible for Heraclius not only to strengthen his rear but also to have an ally in the fight against the Karabakh Khan, who dominated Ganja Khanate. In December 1788, Heraclius now allied with Fath Ali Khan of Quba and his vassal Muhammad Hasan Khan of Shaki was able to capture the outskirts of Ganja. In early 1789, Georgian troops led by the son of Heraclius, Prince Vakhtang, defeated Javad Khan. The matter worsened for Karabakh by the fact that the ally of Ibrahim Khan, Umma Khan of Avar Khanate, due to illness, could not help his ally.  

Fatali Khan and Muhammad Hasan Khan met with King Heraclius in January 1789, inside the Ganja Khanate, on the left bank of the Shamkhor River. Javad Khan also took part in this meeting, shortly before that he presented the “keys to the fortress” to the Quba Khan. Allies worked out a plan of coordinated actions against Karabakh Khanate and divided the spheres of influence: Heraclius took the entire South Caucasus, Fatali Khan was to control Iranian Azerbaijan. Heraclius II and Fatali Khan agreed to actively fight against the newly rising threat of Agha Muhammad Khan Qajar and "act ... under the auspices of Russia," according to contemporary historian Abbasqulu Bakikhanov. Heraclius decided to return the Shamshadil to the Ganja at the request of Fatali khan.

On May 30, general Tekeli reported to Potemkin that, associates of the khan concealed his death to secure his succession.

Personality 
Fatali Khan was a Shia Muslim. According to Samuel Gottlieb Gmelin, who visited him in his palace in Derbent, Fatali was a loved person and didn't hesitate to drink or smoke hookah. Some of his followers even believed that he was practically an atheist. According to Isgander bey Hajinsky, he was also a bit promiscuous. He knew Russian, Persian and Azerbaijani languages, as well as various languages of Dagestan. Some samples of his poetic work have been preserved.

Fatali khan was buried in Baku, in a cemetery of Bibi-Heybat mosque. At present, his gravestone is kept in Azerbaijan State Museum of History.

Family 
Fatali Khan had 6 wives according to Gmelin. However, it appears that only 3 of them were principal ones:

 Tuti Bike (m. 1764, d. 1787) — his cousin and the sister of Amir Hamza, Utsmi of Kaitags
 Ahmad Khan (1769-1790) — Khan of Quba (1789-1790), married Kichik Bike, daughter of shamkhal Bammat II in 1787
 Khanbika khanum (1777-1806) — married Mirza Muhammad Khan II of Baku in 1800
 Elisu Bike or Gulpari (m. 1774, d. 1814) — daughter of an Elisu Sultan, possibly Khanbaba (1762-1803)
 Pari Jahan Khanum (b. 1775) — betrothed to Umma Khan in 1786, married to Mehdi, Shamkhal of Tarki in 1796
 Hasan Khan (1784 - 1803) — Khan of Quba (1796-1797), Khan of Derbent (1799-1803); married to Nur Jahan Khanum (d. 1814) in 1800.
 Sahar Nas (m. 1776)  — an Armenian, sister of a certain Harutyun of Zeykhur
 Shaykh Ali Khan (1778-1822) — Khan of Quba (1790-1796; 1797-1806), Khan of Derbent (1790-1796; 1797-1799; 1803-1806)
Unknown wife or concubine
Chimnaz Khanum — m. 1796 to Abdulla bek, Ghazi of Tabasaran

Legacy
He is remembered for giving refuge to Mountain Jews fleeing from the persecution of Gazikumukh Khanate, founding the village of Red Town, still the only shtetl remaining in the world.

 Agha Mesih Shirvani (d. 1766), a poet, dedicated his now lost “Shahnameh” to Fatali Khan 
 An Azerbaijani song dedicated to Fatali Khan was published as a musical record in a magazine published in 1816–1818, in Astrakhan
 In 1947, a film called “Fatali Khan”, dedicated to the life of the Khan of Quba, was shot by film director Efim Dzigan in a Baku film studio. Fatali Khan was portrayed by Alasgar Alakbarov
 A monument to Fatali Khan was erected on January 3, 1991, on the orders of the Council of Ministers of the Azerbaijan SSR
 One of the central streets of Quba is named after Fatali Khan

References

Sources 

 
 
 
 
 
 
 

 
 
 

1736 births
1789 deaths

Burials in Baku
Azerbaijani nobility
Khans of Quba